Reckless is the thirteenth studio album by American country music singer Martina McBride. The album was released on April 29, 2016, by Nash Icon Records.

Background
The track "It Ain't Pretty", written by Nicolle Galyon and Eric Paslay, was previously recorded by Lady Antebellum for their 2013 album Golden.

Reception
The album debuted at No. 31 on the Billboard 200 chart on its release, and No. 2 on the Top Country Albums charts, selling 16,000 copies the first week. The album sold a further 5,000 copies the second week.  The album has sold 35,400 copies in the US as of August 2016.

Track listing

Personnel 
 Martina McBride – lead vocals, backing vocals (4, 6-9)
 Mike Rojas – acoustic piano (1-4, 6, 8, 9), synthesizers (1, 2), Hammond B3 organ (2, 5-9), Wurlitzer electric piano (5), accordion (9)
 Charlie Judge – synth pads (1), synthesizers (3), strings (3), programming (3, 5), French horn (5)
 Jim Medlin – acoustic piano (10)
 Nathan Chapman – programming (1, 3, 4, 9), acoustic guitar (1, 2, 5-9), mandolin (1, 5, 7), backing vocals (1, 4, 6, 7, 9), bass (2-6, 8, 9)
 Dann Huff – electric guitar (1-9), mandolin (3, 6), sitar (4), acoustic guitar (5, 9)
 Danny Rader – acoustic guitar (3, 4), mandolin (4)
 Dan Dugmore – steel guitar (1, 2, 7, 9), lap steel guitar (5), electric guitar (6)
 Paul Franklin – steel guitar (5, 6, 8)
 Michael Rhodes – bass (1, 7, 9)
 Matt Chamberlain – drums (1, 2, 7, 9), percussion (1, 9)
 Nick Buda – drums (3, 4), percussion (4)
 Shannon Forrest – drums (5, 6, 8), percussion (5, 6, 8)
 Jonathan Yudkin – cello (1), violin (1)
 Carole Rabinowitz – cello (2)
 Kristin Wilkinson – viola (2), string arrangements (2)
 David Angell – violin (2)
 David Davidson – violin (2)
 Sarah Buxton – backing vocals (1)
 Carolyn Dawn Johnson – backing vocals (2)
 Cherie Oakley – backing vocals (3)
 Jason Sever – backing vocals (3, 4, 6, 9)
 Buddy Miller – lead and backing vocals (5)
 Stephanie Chapman – backing vocals (6)
 Keith Urban – lead and backing vocals (8)

Production 
 Nathan Chapman – producer 
 Dann Huff – producer 
 Martina McBride – producer 
 Allison Jones – A&R 
 John McBride – recording, mixing (2, 4, 8-10)
 Allen Ditto – additional recording, recording assistant
 Ernesto Olivera – additional recording
 Adam Chagnon – additional engineer (9)
 Serbian Ghenea – mixing (1)
 John Hanes – mix engineer (1)
 Justin Niebank – mixing (3)
 Chris Lord-Alge – mixing (9)
 Nik Karpen – mix assistant (9)
 Sean Neff – digital editing (3, 7, 9)
 Adam Ayan – mastering 
 Mike Griffith – production coordinator 
 Laurel Kittleson – production coordinator 
 Alicia Mathews – production coordinator 
 Sandi Spika Borchetta – art direction 
 Becky Reiser – art direction
 Karinne Caulkins – graphic design 
 Joseph LIanes – photography 
 Courtney Kivela Robinson – wardrobe stylist 
 Melanie Shelley – hair, make-up 

Studios
 Recorded at Blackbird Studios (Nashville, Tennessee).
 Mixed at Blackbird Studios; Hound's Ear Studio (Franklin, Tennessee); MixStar Studios (Virginia Beach, Virginia); Mix LA (Los Angeles, California).
 Mastered at Gateway Mastering (Portland, Maine).

Charts

Weekly charts

Year-end charts

References

2016 albums
Martina McBride albums
Big Machine Records albums
Albums produced by Dann Huff
Albums produced by Nathan Chapman (record producer)